Ryderwood is a census-designated place (CDP) in Cowlitz County, Washington, USA, west of the city of Vader. The population was 395 at the 2010 census.

History 
Ryderwood was established as a logging camp by the Long-Bell Lumber Company in 1923. Simultaneously, the town of Longview was created to mill and ship the lumber coming out of Ryderwood. Ryderwood was named for W. F. ("Uncle Bill") Ryder, the logging operations manager for Long-Bell, who came to the northwest to locate a timber source. The community was envisioned beyond that of a temporary logging camp, as a permanent center that would contain a school, church and theater. Billed as a place for families to live rather than bachelor workers, Ryderwood was considered a "modern logging town", as an article in The Log of Long-Bell proclaimed.

By 1953, due to advances in timber harvesting technology and the loss of old growth timber, Long-Bell sold the town. It was purchased by Senior Estates, Inc. for $96,000 with the goal of creating a retirement community for pensioners. The town built Ryderwood Lake in 1956, encompassing 6 acres inside an existing gravel pit.

In the 1980s, Ryderwood was home to the beginning of the Winlock Pickersfest, originally a bluegrass festival. The event relocated to Winlock in 2000. , the festival continues to be held.

Ryderwood remains a retirement community managed by the Ryderwood Improvement and Service Association, a non-profit 501(c)4 organization staffed by resident volunteers.

Geography
According to the United States Census Bureau, the CDP has a total area of 0.16 square miles (0.42 km2),  all (100.0%) land.

The town is bordered to the west by Becker Creek and to the east by Campbell Creek and Ryderwood Lake.

Demographics

At the 2010 census, there were 395 people, 221 households and 134 families residing in the CDP. The racial make-up of the CDP was 97.5% White, 0.3% African American, 1.3% Native American, 0.0% Asian, 0.0% Pacific Islander, 0.3% from other races and 0.8% from two or more races. Hispanic or Latino of any race were 0.8% of the population.

There were 221 households, of which 5.2% had children under the age of 18 living with them, 57.9% were married couples living together, 2.7% had a female householder with no husband present and 39.4% were non-families. 33.0% of all households were made up of individuals, and 26.2% had someone living alone who was 65 years of age or older. The average household size was 1.79 and the average family size was 2.15.

2.5% of the population were under the age of 18, 0.8% from 18 to 24, 2.5% from 25 to 44, 24.3% from 45 to 64 and 69.9% were 65 years of age or older. The median age was 68.7 years. For every 100 females, there were 82.9 males. For every 100 females age 18 and over, there were 84.2 males.

Notable people
 Arnold Riegger, sport shooter and Olympian

Notes

References

Census-designated places in Cowlitz County, Washington
Census-designated places in Washington (state)